Metallolophia ocellata is a moth of the family Geometridae first described by William Warren in 1897. It is found in the Khasi Hills of India.

References

Moths described in 1897
Pseudoterpnini